Stella Tillyard FRSL (born 1957) is an English author and historian, educated at Oxford and Harvard Universities and the School of the Museum of Fine Arts, Boston. In 1999 her bestselling book Aristocrats was made into a six-part series for BBC1/Masterpiece Theatre sold to over 20 countries. Winner of the Meilleur Livre Étranger, the Longman/History Today Prize and the Fawcett Prize, she has taught at Harvard; the University of California, Los Angeles; Birkbeck, London and the Centre for Editing Lives and Letters at Queen Mary, London. She is a visiting professor in the Department of History, Classics and Archaeology, Birkbeck, University of London, and a Fellow of the Royal Society of Literature.

Books
2019 George IV: King in Waiting, Penguin Monarchs series, London 
2018 The Great Level, Vintage, London, published in 2019 as Call Upon the Water, Simon & Schuster, New York
2011 Tides of War. A novel of the Peninsular War, Vintage, London. Danish translation available
2006 A Royal Affair. George III and his Troublesome Siblings, Vintage Books, London. Published in New York as A Royal Affair. George III and his Scandalous Siblings, Random House. Swedish translation available
1999 Aristocrats.The Illustrated Companion, Weidenfeld & Nicolson, London 
1997 Citizen Lord. Edward Fitzgerald 1763-1798, Chatto & Windus, London. Russian, Hungarian and Brazilian translations in preparation
1994 Aristocrats. Caroline, Emily, Louisa and Sarah Lennox 1740-1832, Vintage, London. Reprinted by the Folio Society, 2008, with a new introduction. Translations into Danish, Dutch, French, German, Italian, Portuguese and Swedish
1987 The Impact of Modernism, Routledge, London

Professional activities
2019 Fellow of the Royal Society of Literature
2016 Visiting Professor, Birkbeck, University of London
2016 Judge, Sunday Times Young Writer of the Year
2013 Judge, Hesell-Tiltman History Prize for English PEN
2010 Judge, Samuel Johnson Prize
2010-14 Judge, Prison Reform Trust writing competition
2009 Writer in Residence, Farmleigh, Dublin
2006-11 Senior Research Fellow, AHRB Centre for Editing Lives and Letters, Queen Mary, University of London
2002 Judge, Whitbread Prize
1999-2000/2005-6, Columnist, Prospect magazine

Prizes and awards
2012 Orange Prize long list, Tides of War
1999 Meilleur Livre Etranger, Aristocrats
1997 Whitbread Prize biography short list, Citizen Lord 
1995 Fawcett Prize, Aristocrats
1994 Longman/History Today Book of the Year Award, Aristocrats 
1988 Nicholas Pevsner Prize
1981-2 Knox Fellowship, Harvard University
1979-81 Domus Student, Linacre College, Oxford

Film and television
2012 A Royal Affair, Denmark 2012
2009 Deutsches Radio TV documentary, A Royal Affair
2008 "Library Late", National Library, Dublin
2000 "The Making of Aristocrats". One-hour documentary interview. BBC Education
1999 Aristocrats BBC/WGBH 6 part Co-Production with Screen Ireland, for BBC1 and Masterpiece Theatre

Radio
2019 BBC Radio4, A Point of View: 
"The Sea is Back"
"Peak Stuff"
2018 BBC Radio 4, A Point of View:  
"Speak, History!"
"Cities of the Dead"
"A Problem with Words"
"The Museum of Deportation"
2017 BBC Radio 4, A Point of View: "The Screensaver of Life, or the Idling Brain"
2014 BBC Radio 4 on the Georgians
2012 Woman's Hour, Radio 4, "Female Academicians"
2012 Today, Radio 4, "The History of Fame and Celebrity"
2011 BBC Radio 3, "Private Passions"

Recent articles and introductions
2014 Introduction, Jan Morris, The Venetian Empire
2014 "The Creaking of the Scenery", Writing Historical Fiction: The Writers & Artists Companion
2012 Introduction, Nancy Mitford, The Sun King
2008 "Biography and Modernity: some thoughts on origins", Writing Lives, Biography and Textuality, Identity and Representation in Early Modern England
2006 Introduction, James Boswell, London Journal
2006 "All our Pasts", TLS, October 2006. Reprinted in The Author, Spring 2007.
2006 "David Malouf", Prospect
2005 "Alan Hollinghurst", Prospect

Catalogue essays
2015 "Newfoundland", the work of Romilly Saumarez Smith, Edmund de Waal Studio; Sainsbury Centre, Norwich
2005 "Paths of Glory: Fame and the Public in Eighteenth Century London", Joshua Reynolds and the Creation of Celebrity, Tate Britain, London

Recent talks
2019 "The Hanoverians: when Germans spoke French in St James's", Europe House, London
2017 "History and the Historical Novel", Warwick University
2017 "Female Celebrity, Feminism and Celebrity Culture", Oxford University
2016 "Opera and the Historical Novel", Royal Holloway, London
2015 "Tony Small; an African American in Ireland", Dublin Festival of History
2015 "Collecting the World; How Global Art came to Ireland in the Eighteenth Century", Art Institute of Chicago
2015 "Hollywood and the Eighteenth Century", ASECS Conference, Los Angeles
2015 "Two Irish Interiors", Northwestern University
2015 "Celebrity and the Plain Portrait in the Eighteenth Century", Kings College, London, February
2014 "History and the Historical Novel", Warwick University, 14 January

Personal
Tillyard moved to the United States in 1981 and has lived for long periods in Boston, Los Angeles, Chicago and Florence. In 2006 she moved to London. She campaigned for Britain to remain in the EU. She divides her time between London and Italy. She has two children.

References

1957 births
Living people
British women writers
Microhistorians
Harvard University alumni
Alumni of the University of Oxford
Academics of the University of London